Westhoughton is a civil parish in the Metropolitan Borough of Bolton, Greater Manchester, England.  It includes the town of Westhoughton and the settlements of Wingates, White Horse, Four Gates, Chequerbent, Hunger Hill, Snydale, Hart Common, Marsh Brook, Daisy Hill and Dobb Brow.  The area contains ten listed buildings that are recorded in the National Heritage List for England.  Of these, one is listed at Grade II*, the middle of the three grades, and the others are at Grade II, the lowest grade.  The listed buildings include churches and items in churchyards, memorials, a dovecote, a public house, a school, and houses later used as offices.


Key

Buildings

References

Citations

Sources

Lists of listed buildings in Greater Manchester
Buildings and structures in the Metropolitan Borough of Bolton
Listed buildings